Kevin Edward Bedford (born 26 December 1968) in Carshalton, London, is an English retired professional footballer who played as a left back for Wimbledon, Aldershot and Colchester United in the Football League.

References

1968 births
Living people
Footballers from Carshalton
English footballers
Association football defenders
Aldershot F.C. players
Wimbledon F.C. players
Colchester United F.C. players
English Football League players